Lai Chi Kok is a rapid transit station on the  of the Hong Kong MTR system, between  and  stations. It was opened on 17 May 1982.

The station is in an orange-red colour, and is a simple through station with an island platform. Platform screen doors have been retrofitted along both platforms in this station.

Although the station is called Lai Chi Kok, it is located in Cheung Sha Wan. Passengers can use this station to access the western and southern part of Cheung Sha Wan. Western Cheung Sha Wan used to be an industrial area, but in recent years, several residential developments have been built on the reclaimed land, namely Banyan Garden, Liberté, The Pacifica, Aqua Marine, and Hoi Lai Estate. There is a pedestrian subway to connect these developments.

In addition, industrial buildings are being demolished and being rebuilt into brand new commercial buildings. The re-purposing of industrial units into office and retail units has led to the station having a high stream of passengers during peak hours.

The Chinese name of the station does not use the commonly used character , but the character  instead, which is the correct one according to the Kangxi dictionary. The same is true for Lai King station.

History
On 10 May 1982, Tsuen Wan line opened to the public, but Lai Chi Kok station did not open until 17 May, a week after.

Station layout

Colour
The station's colour is orange-red because of the bright red colour of the fruit after which the district is named.

Entrances/Exits
A: Cheung Sha Wan Plaza
B1/B2: Cheung Sha Wan Road
C: Tung Chau West Street 
D1-4: Lai Chi Kok Road

References

Cheung Sha Wan
MTR stations in Kowloon
Tsuen Wan line
Railway stations in Hong Kong opened in 1982